is a 258-episode long Japanese anime television series that adapts various traditional stories from Japan. Each episode of this anime comprises three approximately seven-minute tales. Produced by the Tokyo-based animation company Tomason, it was aired by TV Tokyo from April 1, 2012 to March 26, 2017.

The narration and all character voices are provided by veteran film actors Akira Emoto and Yoneko Matsukane. Voice actress and singer Shoko Nakagawa performed the initial opening and ending theme songs. Tomoyuki Okura, a member of the vocal group INSPi, wrote and composed the opening theme "Hitori no Kimi ga Umareta to sa" (You Were Born Alone), and the ending theme song "Arukou" (Let's Walk) with his fellow INSPi member Keisuke Yoshida. From episode 53 onwards, "Arukou" was replaced by "Pyon Pyon Punyo Punyo no Uta" (Song of Jump! Jump! Cheek! Cheek!) by Shindo Heart (lyrics) and Star Flower (song) from Victor Entertainment. From episode 208 onwards, "Hitori no Kimi ga Umareta to sa" was replaced by "Furusato Hokkorimura" by Hajime Yamanouchi (lyrics) and Kaori Mizumori (song).

A second 50-episode long series,  began airing from April 2, 2017 and it was concluded on March 25, 2018. Each episode of this anime comprises two approximately ten-minute tales instead.

An English-subtitled version was simulcasted on the streaming service Crunchyroll, which describes the main plot as following: "Like in any culture, Japanese kids grow up listening to the stories repeatedly told by their parents and grandparents. The boy born from a peach; the princess from the moon who is discovered inside a bamboo; the old man who can make a dead cherry tree blossom, etc. These short stories that teach kids to see both the dark and bright sides of life have passed traditional moral values from generation to generation."

Hometown Rebuilding: Folktales from Japan episode list

Many tales do have different versi

Hometown Visiting: Folktales from Japan episode list

Explanatory notes

References

External links
 

2012 anime television series debuts
TV Tokyo original programming